The 10th Cavalry Division was a French army unit that fought in World War I in 1914 and was disbanded, after a period of inaction, in 1916.

History

1914
 Mobilized in the 12th, 17th, and 18th .
 3 – 5 August: transported by railroad (V.F. or voie ferrée) to the Rosières-aux-Salines region.
 17 – 20 August: reconnaissance toward Sarrebourg. On 20 August, engaged in the Battle of Sarrebourg.
 20 – 26 August: fallback to Rozelieures, with combat on 24 and 25 August.
 26 August – 3 September: withdrawal toward Nancy and regroup; from 1 September, transported by railroad to the area of Condé-en-Brie.
 3 – 6 September: fallback on Provins.
 6 – 14 September: engaged in the First Battle of the Marne, at the  capturing Château-Thierry, and then pursuing the enemy, past Fismes and Pontavert, to the area around Sissonne.
 14 – 17 September: withdrawal to the south of Aisne then advance toward Reims.
 17 September – 22 October: advance toward Montdidier, fighting around Bapaume in the First Battle of Picardy, then in the Battle of Arras (fighting near Achiet-le-Grand on 28 September, Saint-Léger on 30 September, Pont-à-Vendin on 8 October, and Vermelles on 10 October), and then in the First Battle of Ypres (fighting near Merville on 15 October, Fleurbaix on 16 October, Radinghem on 18 and 21 October).
 22 October – 1 November: retreated and regrouped in the Merville region, near Lillers.
 1–11 November: fighting in Belgium, in the Battle of Messines.
 11 November – 11 December: withdrawal after being relieved by the British army; from 15 November, transported east by railroad to the Charmes area for rest.
 11 December 1914 – 5 January 1915: transported by railroad to the Rougemont-le-Château area with elements being employed near d'Aspach-le-Bas.

1915–1916
 5 January – 20 August: with elements of the territorial army in sector between Leimbach and Burnhaupt-le-Haut.
 20 August – 7 October: withdrawn and rested near Montreux-Vieux.
 7 – 12 October: again with the territorial army between Leimbach and Burnhaupt-le-Haut.
 12 October 1915 – 1 June 1916: again withdrawn and rested near Montreux-Vieux; elements employed in watching the Swiss border.
 1 June 1916: disbanded.

Attachments
 Mobilisation: detached
 August 1914: Conneau Cavalry Corps
 August 1914: detached
 September 1914: Conneau Cavalry Corps
 September 1914: 
 November 1914: detached
 June 1916: disbanded

Commanders
 General Conneau, 1 September 1913 – 15 August 1914
 General Grellet (interim), 15 August – 13 September 1914
 General de Contades-Gizeux, 13 September 1914

Composition

Composition at formation
 10th Brigade of Dragoons:
 
 
 15th Brigade of Dragoons:
 
 
 Attached elements:
 Infantry: 10th Cyclist Group of the 
 Artillery: 1 battery of 75mm guns, 14th Field Artillery Regiment

Composition in January 1915
 10th Brigade of Dragoons:
 15th Regiment of Dragoons
 20th Regiment of Dragoons
 15th Brigade of Dragoons:
 10th Regiment of Dragoons
 19th Regiment of Dragoons
 Matuzinsky Brigade:
 Marching (provisional) regiment of light cavalry
 Marching (provisional) regiment of the 
 Attached elements:
 Infantry: 10th Cyclist Group of the 1st Battalion of Light Infantry
 Artillery: 1 battery of 75s, 14th Field Artillery Regiment

Composition in July 1915
 10th Brigade of Dragoons:
 15th Regiment of Dragoons
 20th Regiment of Dragoons
 15th Brigade of Dragoons:
 10th Regiment of Dragoons
 19th Regiment of Dragoons
 23rd Light Brigade:
 22nd Regiment of Light Cavalry
 16th Regiment of Hussars
 Attached elements:
 Infantry: 10th Cyclist Group of the 1st Battalion of Light Infantry
 Artillery: 1 battery of 75s, 14th Field Artillery Regiment

Composition in May 1916
 10th Brigade of Dragoons:
 15th Regiment of Dragoons
 20th Regiment of Dragoons
 15th Brigade of Dragoons:
 10th Regiment of Dragoons
 19th Regiment of Dragoons
 1st Marching (Provisional) Brigade of African Light Cavalry:
 2nd Regiment of African Light Cavalry
 5th Regiment of African Light Cavalry
 Attached elements:
 Infantry: 10th Cyclist Group of the 1st Battalion of Light Infantry
 Artillery: 1 battery of 75s, 14th Field Artillery Regiment

See also
 French Army in World War I

Bibliography
 

French World War I divisions
Cavalry divisions of France